Natalia Alexeyevna Kononenko (born 25 August 1994 in Kyiv) is a retired Ukrainian artistic gymnast who competed at the 2012 Summer Olympics. She is a two-time European bronze medalist on the uneven bars.

Career

Junior 
Kononenko competed at the 2008 Junior European Championships and helped the Ukrainian team finish seventh. She qualified for the uneven bars and balance beam event finals where she finished eighth and fourth respectively. She also competed at the 2009 Gymnasiade in Doha where the Ukrainian team won the bronze medal behind Russia and Italy. Individually, Kononenko finished seventh in the all-around. In the event finals, she won the silver medal on the uneven bars behind Aliya Mustafina and finished eighth on the balance beam.

Senior 
At the 2010 European Championships in Birmingham, Kononenko contributed scores of 14.625 on uneven bars and 12.600 on balance beam towards Ukraine's eighth-place finish. She won the bronze medal on the uneven bars with a score of 14.750 behind Beth Tweddle and Aliya Mustafina.

At the 2012 London Prepares series, Kononenko placed eighth on the uneven bars. This qualified her a spot for the 2012 Olympics. Then at the 2012 European Championships in Brussels, she finished tenth with her team.  She also won a bronze medal on the uneven bars with a score of 15.133 behind Russians Viktoria Komova and Anastasia Grishina. Kononenko was Ukraine's only representative for women's artistic gymnastics at the 2012 Summer Olympics. In the qualification round, she finished 44th in the all-around, and did not qualify into any event finals.

Eponymous skill 
Kononenko has one eponymous skill listed in the Code of Points.

Personal life 
Kononenko now lives in Sunny Isles, Florida and is a coach.

See also
List of Olympic female artistic gymnasts for Ukraine

External links 
 Official Website

References 

Living people
1994 births
Ukrainian female artistic gymnasts
Gymnasts at the 2012 Summer Olympics
Olympic gymnasts of Ukraine
People from Sunny Isles Beach, Florida
Originators of elements in artistic gymnastics
Gymnasts from Kyiv
21st-century Ukrainian women